Legionella busanensis is a Gram-negative, catalase- and oxidase-positive bacterium from the genus Legionella with a single subpolar flagellum, which was isolated from cooling tower water in Busan in Korea.

References

External links
Type strain of Legionella busanensis at BacDive -  the Bacterial Diversity Metadatabase

Legionellales
Bacteria described in 2003